Prince Alexey Fyodorovich Orlov was a  Russian diplomat, the natural son of Count Fyodor Grigoryevich Orlov. Born in Moscow, he took part in the Napoleonic Wars from 1805 to the  capture of Paris in 1814. For his services as commander of the cavalry regiment of the  Horse Life Guards during  the rebellion of 1825 he was granted the title of count, and in the Turkish War of 1828–1829 he rose to the rank of lieutenant-general.

At this time his diplomatic career began. He served as the Russian plenipotentiary at the Peace of Adrianople, and in 1833 was appointed Russian ambassador at  Constantinople, holding at the same time the post of commander-in-chief of the Black Sea Fleet. He became, indeed, one of the most trusted agents of Emperor  Nicholas I, whom in 1837 he accompanied on his foreign tour. From 1844 to 1856 Orlov headed the infamous Third Section (secret police).

In 1854 he travelled to Vienna to bring  Austria over to the side of Russia during the Crimean War of 1853-1856, but without success. In 1856 he was one of the plenipotentiaries who concluded the Peace of Paris. In the same year, raised to the dignity of prince, he was appointed president of the  Imperial Council of State and of the  Council of Ministers. In 1857, during the absence of Emperor  Alexander II, he presided over the commission formed to consider the question of the emancipation of the serfs, to which he was altogether hostile. He died in Saint Petersburg.

In popular culture

Orlov was the subject of a satirical verse by Alexander Pushkin, alleging that Orlov's mistress, the dancer Istomina, could see his penis only through a microscope.

References

External links 
 

1787 births
1862 deaths
Diplomats from Moscow
People from Moskovsky Uyezd
Russian princes
Members of the State Council (Russian Empire)
Ambassadors of the Russian Empire to the Ottoman Empire
Imperial Russian Army generals
Russian military personnel of the Napoleonic Wars
Russian duellists
Honorary members of the Saint Petersburg Academy of Sciences
Recipients of the Order of St. George
Recipients of the Order of St. Vladimir, 1st class
Recipients of the Order of St. Anna, 1st class
Recipients of the Order of St. Anna, 3rd class
Grand Crosses of the Order of Saint Stephen of Hungary
Recipients of the Pour le Mérite (military class)
Knights of the Military Order of Max Joseph
Knights Commander of the Military Order of William
Grand Croix of the Légion d'honneur
Recipients of the Gold Sword for Bravery
Military personnel from Moscow